Bella Ḥazzan, was an 18th-century Bohemian Yiddish writer.

She was the daughter of the martyr Be'er ben Hezekiah ha-Levi Horwitz and wife of Joseph ben Ḥayyim Ḥazzan, who died at Prague in 1713. In 1705 she published Geshikhte des hoyzes Dovid. In conjunction with Rachel bat Nathan Porges, she edited a history, mostly legendary, of the Jews of Prague, entitled Eine shone geshikhte, zo izt geshehen, ehe nokh Yehudim tsu Prag gevohnt. She also wrote a teḥinah for the Ten Days of Repentance.

References
 

Year of death unknown
Year of birth unknown
Yiddish-language writers
18th-century women writers
18th-century Bohemian writers
Jewish women writers
Historians of Jews and Judaism
Historians of the Czech Republic
Bohemian Jews
Bohemian writers
Czech Jews
17th-century births